The Lost Girls is a 2022 British fantasy film written and directed by Livia De Paolis, based on the 2003 Peter Pan-inspired novel of the same name by Laurie Fox. Set a few generations after the events of J.M. Barrie's original novel, it explores the consequences of Pan's promise to continue returning to the Darlings.

The film was released in theatres and to streaming platforms on June 17, 2022. It received generally mixed to unfavorable reviews.

Cast
Livia De Paolis as Wendy, a descendant of the original Wendy Darling and mother of Berry.
Emily Carey as Young Wendy
Amelia Minto as Little Wendy
Ella-Rae Smith as Berry
 Ava Fillery as Little Berry
Joely Richardson as Jane, mother of Wendy and grandmother of Berry.
 Tilly Marsan as Teen Jane
Vanessa Redgrave as Great Nana, mother of Jane.
Julian Ovenden as Clayton
Parker Sawyers as Adam
Louis Partridge as Peter Pan
Iain Glen as Hook

Production
It was announced in September 2019 that Livia De Paolis would adapt Laurie Anne Fox's novel for film.

Emma Thompson, Ellen Burstyn, and Gaia Wise were originally attached to star in the film alongside De Paolis, but they exited the project at some point with Joely Richardson, Vanessa Redgrave, and Ella-Rae Smith taking their places respectively. Julian Ovenden, Parker Sawyers, Emily Carey, Louis Partridge, and Iain Glen would round out the ensemble cast.

Principal photography took place in England with support from the British Screen Sector Task Forces, wrapping in September 2020.

Release
Myriad Pictures are in charge of international distribution. Altitude bought the UK and Ireland rights to the film.

References

External links

2022 films
Peter Pan films
Films set in Brooklyn
Films set in London
Films shot in England
Films shot in Northumberland